O Drákos (English: The Ogre of Athens or The fiend of Athens), or simply The Dragon, is a 1956 Greek existential and satirical drama crime film, directed by Nikos Koundouros. It tells the story of Thomas, a mousey and dull bank clerk whose physical appearance leads him to be confused with a fierce and notorious criminal. The film highlights as a theme the alienated modern individual and the alienation from the fear imposed by a central government in a social level as well, and encompasses artistically neorealist, expressionist and ancient Greek tragedy features. The film also satirizes the film noir genre. The plot was based on a script by Iakovos Kambanellis, one of Greece's most prominent playwrights, and the music score was written by Manos Hadjidakis with the collaboration of Vasilis Tsitsanis. Although the film was a commercial disaster on its release, it is considered to be one of the most significant works of Modern Greek cinema.
  
It won the award for best movie 1955–1959 in the first Thessaloniki Film Festival. It also took part in the 17th Venice International Film Festival.

At the 2006 International Thessaloniki Film Festival, the film was announced as among the 10 all-time best Greek films by the PHUCC (Pan-Hellenic Union of Cinema Critics).

Plot
A weak and timid man, discovering his resemblance to a famous wanted criminal, "the dragon", gives up his normal, dull life in order to become famous. He becomes the leader of a criminal group (so that they think of him as "the dragon") in a great and ambitious operation.

He also falls in love with a young and beautiful singer working in the bar that is the group's base of operations; but unfortunately she cannot understand his tragic emotional situation.

After a while he is identified not to be "the dragon" by the members of this group and one of them, in anger, murders him.

Cast
 Dinos Iliopoulos as Thomas
 Margarita Papageorgiou as Babe	
 Giannis Argyris as Fatman
 Thanasis Veggos as Spathis
 Maria Lekaki as Carmen
 Theodoros Andrikopoulos	
Andreas Douzos	
 Anestis Vlahos		
 Frixos Nassou			
 Zannino

Trivia
The movie is mentioned (and plays an important role) in Jonathan Franzen's novel Freedom, with the title The Fiend of Athens.

References

External links

O Drakos - Official movie portal

1956 films
1950s Greek-language films
1950s thriller films
Films directed by Nikos Koundouros
Greek thriller films
Films set in Greece
Films scored by Manos Hatzidakis
Greek crime drama films
1956 crime drama films
Greek black-and-white films